Barbara Lang may refer to:

Barbara Lang (film actress) (1928-1982), American film actress
Barbara Lang (Broadway actress), American broadway actress